Bric, BRIC, or BRICS may refer to:

 BRIC, a grouping acronym in economics for the countries of Brazil, Russia, India and China
 BRICS, the acronym for five major emerging national economies: Brazil, Russia, India, China and South Africa
 BRIC, an acronym for the British Rowing Indoor Championships
 Brič, a settlement in the Municipality of Koper, Slovenia
 BRIC (nonprofit organization) (Brooklyn Information & Culture), an American arts and media organization
 BRIC: The New World, a documentary series produced by journalist Jorge Lanata

See also 

 Brick (disambiguation)
 
 
 
 Brico (disambiguation)